Frédéric Cornette (born 29 June 1967 in Laon) is a retired French middle-distance runner who competed primarily in the 800 metres. He represented his country at the 1992 Summer Olympics, as well as two World Championships, in 1991 and 1995.

His personal bests in the event are 1:45.82 outdoors (Nice 1992) and 1:48.46 indoors (Liévin 1997).

Competition record

References

1967 births
Living people
People from Laon
French male middle-distance runners
Olympic athletes of France
Athletes (track and field) at the 1992 Summer Olympics
World Athletics Championships athletes for France
Athletes (track and field) at the 1991 Mediterranean Games
Mediterranean Games competitors for France
Sportspeople from Aisne